The Kureyka (also Lyuma, Numa) is a major right tributary of the Yenisey in Krasnoyarsk Krai, Russia.

The Kureyka basin is very sparsely populated. The village of Kureyka used to have a museum dedicated to Joseph Stalin, who was exiled there in 1914–17. The Kureyskaya Hydroelectric Station was built in 1975–2002. Plans for another power station somewhere downstream are under consideration.

Course
It falls from the Putorana Plateau to the vast taiga plain of Northern Siberia and flows northward passing through a series of elongated lakes, including the Yadun, Anama, and Dyupkun lakes.

Its valley forms the northern boundary of the Tunguska Plateau.

See also
List of rivers of Russia

References 

Rivers of Krasnoyarsk Krai